This was the first edition of the tournament.

Nicolás Barrientos and Miguel Ángel Reyes-Varela won the title after defeating Gonçalo Oliveira and Divij Sharan 7–5, 6–3 in the final.

Seeds

Draw

References

External links
 Main draw

San Marcos Open Aguascalientes - Doubles